Lake Hubert Depot in Lake Hubert, Minnesota, United States, is a one-story wood frame passenger depot built on the Minnesota and International Railway line around 1918.  The rail line later became part of the Northern Pacific Railway and is now part of the Paul Bunyan State Trail. 

It is divided into a single enclosed freight house, and three open bays for passenger accommodation. A double-sided wood bench is located along the center of the passenger section. The depot was built between Clark and Hubert lakes along the south side of the Minnesota and International Railway tracks. It was moved northwest approximately 400 ft. to its present location around 1970.

References

Lake Hubert, Minnesota
Railway stations on the National Register of Historic Places in Minnesota
Railway stations in the United States opened in 1918
National Register of Historic Places in Crow Wing County, Minnesota
Former railway stations in Minnesota
1918 establishments in Minnesota
Transportation in Crow Wing County, Minnesota